Qurd ol Duran may refer to:
 Qurd ol Duran-e Ajam
 Qurd ol Duran-e Kord